Narva Kalev-Fama Stadium is a football stadium in Narva, Estonia. With a capacity of 1,000, it is home to JK Narva Trans, who uses the stadium as a training base, as well as a home ground during winter and early spring months.

The name of the stadium originates from Narva's former 17th century fortification named Fama Bastion.

History 
The stadium was built after World War II, in 1965. Before that, the field was known as Rahva väli and Sõjawäli.  Initially named as Narva Kalevi staadion, it was the main sports ground of the city until the construction of Kreenholm Stadium in 1979 saw the stadium turn into a semi-abandoned sports facility.

After major renovations, the stadium was re-opened on 12 October 2013 as Kalev-Fama Stadium. In 2017, a roof was installed for the grandstand.

On 31 August 2018, the stadium was visited by then President of Estonia Kersti Kaljulaid, who watched Narva Trans draw 1–1 with Pärnu Vaprus.

Kalev-Fama Stadium was the venue for the 2020 Estonian Supercup final and saw Flora defeat Narva Trans 2–0.

References 

Football venues in Estonia
Sport in Narva
JK Narva Trans
Buildings and structures in Narva